Kimosabe is the seventh album from Canadian singer and guitarist Kim Mitchell. The album was released in 2000.

This is the only Kim Mitchell album that failed to gain any real commercial success; however, this does not bother Mitchell. It was written after his divorce and he still occasionally plays a song from the album, telling audiences "you may still be able to find this album at Walmart in the bargain bins". It also did not help that the label that Mitchell signed with went out of business shortly after the album's release.

Track listing
All songs written by Kim Mitchell and Andy Curran, except where noted
 "Monkey Shine" – 4:37
 "Stickin My Heart" – 4:44
 "Cellophane" – 4:08
 "Two Steps Home" (Mitchell, Ringgenberg) – 4:51
 "Kimosabe" – 3:56
 "Blow Me a Kiss" – 4:28
 "Cold Reality" (Mitchell) – 4:31
 "Over Me" (Mitchell) – 4:04
 "Get Back What's Gone" – 4:56
 "Skinny Buddah" – 6:21

Personnel
Musicians
 Kim Mitchell – guitars, vocals, producer, engineer
 Gary Breit – organ, piano, keyboards, vocals
 Peter Fredette – bass vocals
 Randy Cooke – drums, percussion

Additional musicians
 Carlos del Junco – harmonica
 Dalbello – vocals
 Andy Curran – vocals

Production
 Graham Brewer, Scott Lake – engineers
 Vic Florencia – mixing
 Nick Blagona – mastering at Metalworks
 George Graves – additional editing at The Lacquer Channel
 W. Tom Berry – management
 Rob Waymen – photography
 Patrick Duffy – art direction and design

See also
 Ke-mo sah-bee

References

External links
 http://www.kimmitchell.ca

1999 albums
Kim Mitchell albums
Albums recorded at Metalworks Studios